Hanspeter Bellingrodt (born 25 April 1943) is a Colombian former sports shooter. He finished fifteenth in the 50 metre running target event at the 1972 Summer Olympics and thirteenth in the 50 metre running target event at the 1976 Summer Olympics.

His brothers Horst and Helmut Bellingrodt were Olympians as well.

References

1943 births
Living people
Colombian male sport shooters
Olympic shooters of Colombia
Shooters at the 1972 Summer Olympics
Shooters at the 1976 Summer Olympics
Place of birth missing (living people)
Running target shooters
Colombian people of German descent
20th-century Colombian people